|}

This is a list of House of Assembly results for the 1938 South Australian state election.

Results by electoral district

Adelaide

Albert 

 Preferences were not distributed.

Alexandra

Angas 

! colspan="6" style="text-align:left;" |After distribution of preferences

 Preferences were not distributed to completion.

Burnside

Burra

Chaffey

Eyre 

Preferences were not distributed.

Flinders

Frome 

 Preferences were not distributed.

Gawler

Glenelg

Goodwood

Gouger

Gumeracha 

 Preferences were not distributed.

Hindmarsh

Light 

! colspan="6" style="text-align:left;" |After distribution of preferences

 Preferences were not distributed to completion.

Mitcham 

 Preferences were not distributed.

Mount Gambier

Murray

Newcastle

Norwood

Onkaparinga

Port Adelaide

Port Pirie

Prospect

Ridley

Rocky River 

 Preferences were not distributed.

Semaphore

Stanley

Stirling

Stuart

Thebarton

Torrens

Unley

Victoria

Wallaroo

Yorke Peninsula

Young 

 Preferences were not distributed.

See also
 Candidates of the 1938 South Australian state election
 Members of the South Australian House of Assembly, 1938–1941

References 

1938
1938 elections in Australia
1930s in South Australia